St Columba's Church is one of the two London congregations of the Church of Scotland. The church building, designed by Sir Edward Maufe, is located in Pont Street, Knightsbridge, near Harrod's department store. It was given Grade II listing by English Heritage in 1988.

History
The presence of Scottish Presbyterianism in London dates back to the Union of the Crowns in 1603. A congregation was established near what is now Trafalgar Square, with a permanent church later being built in Crown Court near Covent Garden. This church is still in use, although rebuilt. The growth in the Scottish community in London resulted in the need for a larger church than Crown Court Church alone could accommodate. The original St Columba's Church building of 1884 was destroyed by wartime bombing during the night of 10 May 1941. It was rebuilt on the same site in 1955 to a striking contemporary design by the architect Sir Edward Maufe, who also designed Guildford Cathedral. The church is named after Saint Columba, the famous saint from Ulster.

The war memorial chapel was dedicated on 25 March 1956.

The dance society London Reels meets at St Columba's once a month from September to June to dance Highland Reels.

Ministry
The current minister (as at April 2020) is the Rev C. Angus MacLeod, who was inducted to the charge by the Church of Scotland's Presbytery of England on 7 June 2012.

Newcastle congregation
St Columba's Church is linked (i.e. shares a minister) with St Andrew's Church in Newcastle-upon-Tyne. This church is located at the junction of Sandyford Road and Grantham Road in Newcastle. The nearest Tyne and Wear Metro station is Jesmond.

Moderators
There have been three Ministers of St. Columba's who have held the office as Moderator of the General Assembly of the Church of Scotland:
 Very Rev. Robert F. V. Scott, 1956
 Very Rev. J. Fraser McLuskey, 1983
 Very Rev. John H. McIndoe, 1996

Television
St Columba's featured in an episode of the BBC comedy series Absolutely Fabulous in 1996. The Rev Calum MacLeod, the Assistant Minister of St Columba's at the time, officiated at the wedding of "Saffy". Mr. MacLeod is currently the Minister of St Giles' Cathedral, Edinburgh.

See also
Church of Scotland
List of Church of Scotland parishes
List of churches in London
Nordic churches in London
St Botolph's, Aldersgate (Free Church of Scotland in London)

References

External links

St Columba's Church, London
Crown Court Church, London
Home page of London Reels 

Religious organizations established in 1884
Rebuilt churches in the United Kingdom
London
Churches completed in 1955
20th-century churches in the United Kingdom
Church of Scotland churches in London
Churches in the Royal Borough of Kensington and Chelsea
Grade II listed churches in London
Knightsbridge